This list of tunnels in Sweden includes any road, rail or waterway tunnel in Sweden.

Under construction:
Förbifart Stockholm, road, 17 km (started in 2014, estimate completion in 2030)
Västlänken, Göteborg, railway, 2 tubes, 6 km (started in 2017, estimate completion in 2026)
Varbergstunneln, Varberg, railway, 3.1 km (started in 2019, estimate completion in 2024)
Extension of the Blue line, Kungsträdgården-Nacka, Metro, 8 km, making it 22 km (started in 2019, estimate completion in 2030)
Planned construction:
Through Kålmården, railway, around 8 km  (estimate start in 2021, estimate completion in 2035)
Under the Göteborg Landvetter Airport, railway, around 5 km (estimate start in 2026, estimate completion in 2035)

See also
List of tunnels by location

Sweden
 
Tunnels
Tunnels